The 1897–98 French Rugby Union Championship was won by Stade Français.

As in the previous season, the title is assigned with a round robin tournament.

Ranking
 Stade Français 10 points
 Racing Club de France 6 pts
 Olympique 6 pts
 Ligue Athlétique 6 pts
 Union Athlétique du Premier 2 pts
 Cosmopolitan Club 0 pt

External links
 Compte rendu du championnat 1898, sur lnr.fr

1898
France
Championship